Netreba was a village in Wołyń Voivodeship (1921–1939), in Sarny county, gmina Kisorycze, Poland, destroyed by the UPA in July 1943. Many of its residents converted to Roman Catholicism before the onset of the Nazi German and Soviet invasion of Poland in 1939, which contributed to the 1943 murderous raid by the Ukrainian death squads. The few surviving Netreba refugees built dugouts in the forest where they saved themselves. 

The solitary church still standing at the end of the war, was dismantled soon after by the Soviet authorities and the materials used in the construction of pig-stalls in nearby kolhozs (government-run farms).

At present, Netreba is an open field in Rivne Oblast of Ukraine.

 Geographical coordinates: 51° 6' 0" North, 27° 20' 0" East

References

 Baruch Shehori (Schwartzblat) (Haifa),  "The Soviets Occupy Our Town" Translated by Ala Gamulka 
 Netreba at Maplandia.com
 Netreba – Ukraine at IndexMundi.com

Villages in Sarny Raion